The Loxa viridis is a species of the family Pentatomidae.

Insects described in 1811
Pentatomini